is a Japanese fashion model from Saitama Prefecture. She is managed by Asiacross.

Biography

Personal life
Kuroda's father is Japanese and her mother is English. Her hobbies are listening to music and reading.

Career

Kuroda has appeared in numerous fashion magazines and commercials in Japan.

Magazines
GLAMOROUS
CLASSY
GINGER
sweet
Spring
In Red
Shel'tter
OTONA Look!s
VOCE
MAQUIA
MISS

Television commercials
Moussy
Adidas (China)

Photo books 
 Gekkan Kuroda Eimi（May 14, 2010, Shinchosha Publishing Co., Ltd、Photography:Hajime Sawatari）

References

External links
 Official website 

Japanese female models
Models from Saitama Prefecture
Japanese people of English descent
1988 births
Living people